The Savannah, Americus and Montgomery Railway (SA&M) was a historic railroad located in the U.S. states of Georgia and Alabama.  SA&M was built in the 1880s running between Montgomery, Alabama and Lyons, Georgia.  It would be completed to Savannah, Georgia in 1896 after being renamed the Georgia and Alabama Railway.  The line would notably become part of the Seaboard Air Line Railroad network in 1900.

History

Early years
The first segment of the Savannah, Americus and Montgomery Railway was chartered in 1884 as the  narrow gauge Americus, Preston and Lumpkin Railroad, which ran from Louvale to Abbeville. The Americus, Preston and Lumpkin Railroad was reorganized as Savannah, Americus and Montgomery Railway in 1888. In 1890, the line was extended from Abbeville east to Lyons. A year later, the SA&M was extended west from Louvale across the Chattahoochee River to Montgomery, Alabama, which opened on December 1, 1891. By 1891, the railroad operated five riverboats on the Ocmulgee River and the Altamaha River. In 1892, the SA&M leased the Albany, Florida and Northern Railway which ran from the SA&M at Cordele to Albany. At its peak, the railroad had a length of 340 miles.

Receivership

In 1895, the SA&M went into receivership.  The lease of the Albany, Florida and Northern Railway was terminated, which then became the independent Albany and Northern Railway.  The SA&M was bought by a syndicate that included the Richmond bankers John L. Williams and Sons. One of John L. Williams's sons, John Skelton Williams, became president of the line, renaming it the Georgia and Alabama Railway (not to be confused with the Georgia and Alabama Railroad, a separate railroad which was based further north in Rome, Georgia).  The line was finally extended to Savannah in 1896.  The Georgia and Alabama Railway would also acquire the Abbeville and Waycross Railroad.  The Georgia and Alabama Railway ran a daily passenger train from Savannah to Montgomery, and the line was nicknamed the "Savannah Short Line" since it has the shortest route between the two cities compared to its competitors.

Seaboard Air Line ownership

In January 1899, John Skelton Williams's syndicate offered to purchase a majority of shares in railroads along the east coast of the United States that would become the Seaboard Air Line Railroad.  By 1900, the Georgia and Alabama Railway formally became part of the Seaboard Air Line.  John Skelton Williams served as the first president of the Seaboard Air Line, and he would later serve as the United States Comptroller of the Currency.  The Georgia and Alabama Railway connected to the Seaboard Air Line's main line in Savannah.  Once under the ownership of the Seaboard Air Line, the line was designated as the company's Savannah Subdivision from Savannah to Americus, and the Montgomery Subdivision from Americus to Montgomery.  The Seaboard continued to operate passenger service between Savannah and Montgomery, as well as local freight trains and their Red Ball freight trains along the route.  This included named freight trains such as the Alaga and the Pioneer.

In 1944, the Seaboard Air Line acquired the Georgia Florida and Alabama Railway, which ran from Richland south to Florida.  This acquisition generated more traffic on the former SA&M since it provided the Seaboard with not only an additional route to Florida, but also a direct route to Florida from Montgomery.

On June 28, 1959, a Seaboard mixed freight train derailed on the line crossing the Ogeechee River in Meldrim.  Loaded LPG tank cars from the train plunged into the river below and ruptured.  The resulting fire and explosion from the ruptured tanks killed 23 people along the river that day as it was a popular area to swim and picnic at.

Later years

In 1967, the Seaboard Air Line merged with its rival, the Atlantic Coast Line Railroad, and the combined company was named the Seaboard Coast Line Railroad.  The Atlantic Coast Line operated a nearly parallel route between Savannah and Montgomery just to the south (much of that line was historically the Savannah, Florida and Western Railway).  The company initially retained both lines in the combined network and designated the Seaboard Air Line route as the Vidalia Subdivision from Savannah to Americus, and the Americus Subdivision from Americus to Montgomery (the Savannah Subdivision designation was then reused for the company's main lines in Savannah).  While the SA&M line remained in service after the merger, traffic diminished since the company favored the Atlantic Coast Line's route from Savannah to Montgomery.  In 1980, the Seaboard Coast Line's parent company merged with the Chessie System, creating the CSX Corporation.  The CSX Corporation initially operated the Chessie and Seaboard Systems separately until 1986, when they were merged into CSX Transportation.

The line was abandoned between Montgomery and Mahrt, Alabama (located along the Chattahoochee River near Cottonton) on April 20, 1986. The remaining line from Mahrt to Rhine, Georgia was sold by CSX Transportation to the Georgia Southwestern Railroad on June 5, 1989. Georgia Southwestern ended operations on the line from Preston to Mahrt in 1999, and the state of Georgia acquired the segment and sought a new operator for the line.  The Heart of Georgia Railroad was created in 1999 for the purpose of operating the line on behalf of the state.  On May 22, 2000, the state purchased the remaining portion of the line not already under their ownership between Omaha, Georgia and the end of the line across the Chattahoochee River in Mahrt as well as an additional  between Rochelle and Preston retained by the Georgia Southwestern.  The Heart of Georgia took over operations of the line from the Georgia Southwestern in 2000.

Current conditions

The former Savannah, Americus and Montgomery Railway from Savannah to Vidalia is currently operated by the Georgia Central Railway, who also operates the former Macon, Dublin and Savannah Railroad.

From Vidalia west to a point near Preston, Georgia is still operated by the Heart of Georgia Railroad.  On February 7, 2017, Genesee & Wyoming purchased the Heart of Georgia (who also owns the Georgia Central Railway).  The line is still in place from Preston west to Mahrt, Alabama, but that segment is out of service.

The Heart of Georgia Railroad also hosts the SAM Shortline Railroad heritage train of about 45 miles between Archery, Georgia and Cordele. The name SAM Shortline is a reference to the Savannah, Americus and Montgomery Railway.  The train is managed by the Southwest Georgia Railroad Excursion Authority with the HOG providing the locomotives and operating crews.

Historic stations

References

Defunct Georgia (U.S. state) railroads
Defunct Alabama railroads
Narrow gauge railroads in Georgia (U.S. state)
Narrow gauge railroads in Alabama
Predecessors of the Seaboard Air Line Railroad
Railway companies established in 1888
Railway companies disestablished in 1895
3 ft gauge railways in the United States
Seaboard Air Line Railroad